Sanchai Ratiwatana and Sonchat Ratiwatana were the defending champions, but chose not participate that year.

Eric Butorac and Rajeev Ram won in the final, 6–3, 6–4, over Jean-Claude Scherrer and Stanislas Wawrinka.

Seeds

Draw

Draw

External links
Main Draw

Doubles